Edward Blount (born February 26, 1964) is a former American football quarterback who played for one season in the National Football League for the San Francisco 49ers and the Seattle Seahawks during 1987. He played college football at Washington State.

College career
Blount was a member of the Washington State Cougars for five seasons, redshirting his true freshman season. He suffered a serious shoulder injury and then spent the 1984 and 85 seasons as the backup to Mark Rypien. He was the Cougars starting quarterback as a redshirt senior. He completed 13 of 20 passes for 201 yards and 2 touchdowns to snap a 29-game losing streak to USC with a 34–14 victory. Blount finished the season with 1,882 yards, 11 touchdowns and 11 interceptions on 117 of 227 passing and rushed 183 yards and three touchdowns.

Professional career
Blount was signed by the San Francisco 49ers as a replacement player during the 1987 NFL players strike. He served as the 49ers third-string quarterback and appeared in one game, rushing once for no gain and fumbled during the play. He was released when the strike ended. Blount was signed by the Seattle Seahawks, but was released one week later. He played one season overseas in Italy and played semi-professional football for the Burbank Bandits of the High Desert Football League for several years, occasionally earning tryouts from professional teams but was never offered a contract.

References

1964 births
Living people
Players of American football from Los Angeles
Players of American football from Pasadena, California
American football quarterbacks
Washington State Cougars football players
San Francisco 49ers players
National Football League replacement players
American expatriate sportspeople in Italy
Seattle Seahawks players